Oroblemus is a genus of beetles in the family Carabidae, containing the following species:

 Oroblemus caecus Ueno & Yoshida, 1966
 Oroblemus dilaticollis Ueno, 1983
 Oroblemus katorum Ueno, 1983
 Oroblemus parvicollis Ueno, 1987
 Oroblemus sparsepilifer Ueno, 1975
 Oroblemus subsulcipes Ueno, 1983
 Oroblemus yamauchii Ueno, 1993

References

Trechinae